Agnė Šilinytė (born 12 April 1991) is a Lithuanian racing cyclist. She competed in the 2012 UCI women's road race in Valkenburg aan de Geul and in the 2013 UCI women's road race in Florence.

References

External links

1991 births
Living people
Lithuanian female cyclists
Sportspeople from Vilnius